The 1975–76 Princeton Tigers men's basketball team represented Princeton University in intercollegiate college basketball during the 1975–76 NCAA Division I men's basketball season. The head coach was Pete Carril and the team co-captains were Armond Hill and Michael Steuerer. The team played its home games in the Jadwin Gymnasium on the university campus in Princeton, New Jersey.  It was the undefeated Ivy League and earned birth in the 32-team 1976 NCAA Division I men's basketball tournament.

The team posted a 22–5 overall record and a 14–0 conference record. The team lost its March 13, 1976 NCAA Division I men's basketball tournament East Regional first round game against the  54–53 at the Providence Civic Center in Providence, Rhode Island.

During the season, the team spent two weeks of the seventeen-week season ranked in the Associated Press Top Twenty Poll, peaking at number fifteen and ending the season unranked. However, the team finished the season ranked tied at number nineteen in the final UPI Coaches' Poll.  The team was the first of nineteen Princeton teams to win the national statistical championship in scoring defense with an average of 52.9 points allowed. That was an NCAA record (since 1965) that the team would break the following season.  Ilan Ramati posted seven blocked shots against  on January 6, 1976, which established an Ivy League record that would stand until Chris Dudley had nine on February 14, 1987. It remains a league record for non-conference games.  In the same game, Frank Sowinski made all twelve of his free throws to find his way into the Ivy League's record books although short of Bill Bradley's perfect 16 free throw night and the Ivy League record of 21.  Michael Steurer had eight steals against  on February 6, 1976, which established an Ivy League record that would stand until March 5, 1983.

The team was led by first team All-Ivy League selection Armond Hill, who was named Ivy League Men's Basketball Player of the Year, and by fellow first team selection Barnes Hauptfuhrer.  Hill was selected in the 1976 NBA Draft with the 9th overall selection in the first round by the Atlanta Hawks, while Hauptfuhrer was selected with the 43rd overall selection in the third round by the Houston Rockets. Hill repeated as the free throw percentage statistical champion with an 84.8% average.  He also surpassed Tim van Blommesteyn's Ivy League single-season steals record set the prior season by one with 73, establishing a record that would last twenty-four years.

Regular season
The team posted a 22–5 (14–0 Ivy League) record.

! = Michigan Invitational at Ann Arbor, Mich.
@ = Maryland Invitational at College Park, Md.
 # = NCAA first round at Providence, R.I.

Home games in CAPS

Rankings

NCAA tournament
The team won the 1976 NCAA Division I men's basketball tournament.

3/13/76 in Providence, R.I.: Rutgers 54, Princeton 53

Awards and honors
 Armond Hill
 Ivy League Men's Basketball Player of the Year
 First Team All-Ivy League
 All-East
 Barnes Hauptfuhrer
 First Team All-Ivy League
 Bob Slaughter
 Second Team All-Ivy League

Team players drafted into the NBA
Three players from this team were selected in the NBA Draft.

References

Princeton Tigers men's basketball seasons
Princeton
Princeton
Princeton Tigers men's basketball
Princeton Tigers men's basketball